USS Contocook, and alternatively spelled Contoocook may refer to:

, was a screw sloop launched in 1864; name changed to Albany in 1869 and sold in 1872
, was a fleet tug launched in 1920 and sold in 1934
Contoocook was originally intended as a fleet oiler for the U.S. Navy but her acquisition was canceled in 1945; she later served as 

United States Navy ship names